Jeremy Davies or Davis may refer to:

Jeremy Davies (born 1969), American actor
Jeremy Davies (exorcist) (1935–2022), English Roman Catholic priest and former physician
Jeremy Davis (born 1985), American bassist
Geremy Davis (born 1992), American football player